The Megapodagrionidae are a family of damselflies,
commonly called flatwings for their habit of spreading out the hind wings horizontally when at rest.

A 2013 phylogenetic analysis pares down this family into only three genera, and numerous other genera are now placed in different families, including Amanipodagrionidae, Argiolestidae, Heteragrionidae, Hypolestidae, Lestoideidae, Mesagrionidae, Mesopodagrionidae, Philogeniidae, Philosinidae, Protolestidae, Rhipidolestidae, Tatocnemididae, and Thaumatoneuridae.

Genera
Allopodagrion Förster, 1910
Megapodagrion Selys, 1885
Teinopodagrion De Marmels, 2001

References

 
Odonata families
Odonata of Australia
Taxa named by Philip Powell Calvert